Adolph M. Christianson (August 11, 1877 – February 11, 1954) was an attorney and a justice of the North Dakota Supreme Court.

Background
Adolph Marcus Christianson was born at Brumunddal in Ringsaker, Hedmark County, Norway. He came to the United States with his parents in 1882. He spent his childhood in Polk County, Minnesota and received his early education in the Minnesota public schools. He attended the Law Department of the University of Tennessee. He was admitted to the bar on March 27, 1889. He moved to North Dakota in 1900 and was admitted to the North Dakota Bar.

Career
Christianson opened an office in Towner, North Dakota, where he practiced until his election to the North Dakota Supreme Court. He served as state's attorney from 1901 until 1905. Christianson served as a justice of the  North Dakota Supreme Court from 1915–1954 and the chief justice from 1918–1921, 1925–1927, 1931–1933, 1937–1939, and 1945–1949. Christianson died in office at the age of 76 after having served on the Court for 39 years and one month.  His burial was at the Fairview Cemetery in Bismarck, North Dakota.

References

1877 births
1954 deaths
People from Ringsaker
Norwegian emigrants to the United States
Chief Justices of the North Dakota Supreme Court
People from McHenry County, North Dakota
University of Tennessee alumni
People from Polk County, Minnesota
District attorneys in North Dakota
Minnesota lawyers
Justices of the North Dakota Supreme Court